Charles Eadie Masson (September 12, 1884 – October 17, 1954) was a Canadian amateur ice hockey right winger who was active in the early 1900s. One of the clubs Masson played for was the Ottawa Victorias of the Federal Amateur Hockey League. He was born in Ottawa, Ontario, the son of former City of Ottawa alderman Donald T. Masson.

Owen McCourt incident
In the 1906–07 FAHL season Masson was involved in an early era incident of lethal hockey violence. On March 6, 1907, in a game between Masson's Ottawa Victorias and the Cornwall Hockey Club on the Victoria rink in Cornwall, Ontario, Masson struck Cornwall's Owen "Bud" McCourt in the head with his stick. McCourt died of his injuries the following morning. As a result of the incident Masson was put on trial charged first with murder and later with manslaughter, but was acquitted on both accounts.

References

Notes

1884 births
1954 deaths
Canadian ice hockey right wingers
Ice hockey people from Ottawa
Pittsburgh Pirates (WPHL) players
Montreal Victorias players
Montreal Hockey Club players